Kaloyanovo may refer to:

 Kaloyanovo Municipality - a municipality in Plovdiv Province, Bulgaria
 Kaloyanovo, Plovdiv Province - a village in Kaloyanovo Municipality, Plovdiv Province, Bulgaria
 Kaloyanovo, Sliven Province - a village in Sliven Municipality, Sliven Province, Bulgaria